Control is the fourth studio album released by Dutch band Kensington. It was released on October 28, 2016, by Universal Music.

Recording 
The band hired American producer Michael Beinhorn to assist with the recording and production of the album.

Track listing

Charts

Weekly charts

Year-end charts

Certifications

References 

2016 albums